Seven Hills railway station is located on the Main Western line, serving the Sydney suburbs of Kings Langley, Lalor Park, Seven Hills and Seven Hills West. It is served by Sydney Trains T1 Western and T5 Cumberland line services.

History
Seven Hills station opened on 1 December 1863. The station was rebuilt in the 1940s when the Main Western line was quadrupled.

Immediately west of the station, the Richmond line branches off via a 1955-built pre-stressed concrete girder bridge.

Platforms & services

Transport links
Busways operates one route via Seven Hills station:
718: to Kings Langley

Hillsbus operate seven routes via Seven Hills station:
611: Blacktown station to Macquarie Park
630: Blacktown station to Epping station
702: to Blacktown station
705: Blacktown station to Parramatta station 
711: Blacktown station to Parramatta station
714: to Bella Vista
715: to Rouse Hill

Seven Hills station is served by two NightRide routes:
N70: Penrith station to Town Hall station
N71: Richmond station to Town Hall station

Trackplan

References

External links

Seven Hills station details Transport for New South Wales
Seven Hills Station Public Transport Map Transport for NSW

Easy Access railway stations in Sydney
Main Western railway line, New South Wales
Railway stations in Sydney
Railway stations in Australia opened in 1863
Seven Hills, New South Wales